Crisanto Grajales Valencia (born 6 May 1987) is a Mexican triathlete who won gold medals at the 2014 Central American and Caribbean Games and 2015 Pan American Games. He placed 28th at the 2012 Olympics and 12th at the 2016 Rio Games.

Grajales took up triathlon aged nine. He served as the flag bearer for Mexico at the 2011 Pan American Games and won the Mexican National Sports Award in 2015.

He won the gold medal in the men's triathlon at the 2019 Pan American Games held in Lima, Peru. He also won the bronze medal in the mixed relay event.

In 2021, he competed in the men's triathlon at the 2020 Summer Olympics held in Tokyo, Japan.

References 

1987 births
Living people
Mexican male triathletes
Triathletes at the 2012 Summer Olympics
Triathletes at the 2016 Summer Olympics
Triathletes at the 2020 Summer Olympics
Olympic triathletes of Mexico
Sportspeople from Veracruz
People from Xalapa
Pan American Games gold medalists for Mexico
Pan American Games medalists in triathlon
Central American and Caribbean Games gold medalists for Mexico
Central American and Caribbean Games silver medalists for Mexico
Competitors at the 2010 Central American and Caribbean Games
Competitors at the 2014 Central American and Caribbean Games
Triathletes at the 2015 Pan American Games
Triathletes at the 2019 Pan American Games
Central American and Caribbean Games medalists in triathlon
Medalists at the 2015 Pan American Games
Medalists at the 2019 Pan American Games
20th-century Mexican people
21st-century Mexican people